Samuel Harrison Reed House is a historic home located at Biltmore Village, Asheville, Buncombe County, North Carolina. It was built in 1892, and is a Queen Anne style dwelling.

It was listed on the National Register of Historic Places in 1979.

References

Houses on the National Register of Historic Places in North Carolina
Queen Anne architecture in North Carolina
Houses completed in 1892
Houses in Asheville, North Carolina
National Register of Historic Places in Buncombe County, North Carolina